This is a list of compositions by Jenő Hubay, Hungarian violinist, composer and music teacher.

External links
Hubay Jenő Foundation: List of compositions
List of compositions 

Hubay, Jeno